Goodenia glauca, commonly known as pale goodenia, is a species of flowering plant in the family Goodeniaceae and is endemic to the drier inland areas of eastern continental Australia. It is a glaucous, erect, ascending perennial herb with lance-shaped to elliptic leaves and racemes of pale yellow flowers.

Description

Taxonomy and naming
Goodenia glauca was first formally described in 1855 by Ferdinand von Mueller in the Transactions and Proceedings of the Victorian Institute for the Advancement of Science. The specific epithet (glauca) means "having a bluish-grey or bluish-green bloom".

Distribution and habitat
This goodenia mainly grows on floodplains and river banks on heavy soils in the drier inland areas of Queensland, South Australia, Victoria and New South Wales.

References

glauca
Flora of South Australia
Flora of Queensland
Flora of New South Wales
Flora of Victoria (Australia)
Plants described in 1855
Taxa named by Ferdinand von Mueller
Endemic flora of Australia